Zimm may refer to:

 Bruno H. Zimm (1920–2005), American polymer chemist and DNA researcher
 Zimm-Bragg model, a helix-coil transition model in statistical mechanics
 Bruno Louis Zimm (1867-1943) American sculptor
 Maurice Zimm (1909–2005), American radio, television and film writer
 ZentralInstitut für Mathematik und Mechanik, part of the German Academy of Sciences at Berlin, also known as the Academy of Sciences (ADW) of the German Democratic Republic :de:Liste der Institute der Akademie der Wissenschaften der DDR
 Zimm., taxonomic author abbreviation for Albrecht Zimmermann (1860–1931), German botanist

See also
Zim (disambiguation)